The Shri C V Gandhi High School (or C V Gandhi) in Ranasan Town in Talod in Sabarkantha is one of the oldest public schools in India.

Student life 
Sport teams from the school travel around the country to participate in inter public school competitions and district/state/national level events.
Co-curricular activities include public speaking/recitation/debates, bio-enrichment camps, and other cultural activities.
The school motto is Yasya Bhuddhi, Balam Tasya ("Power is where there is knowledge").

Council presidents 
 Prakashchandra M Shah
 Lalitbhai Trivedi
 Naranbhai M Patel

See also 
 Ranasan
 List of the oldest schools in the world

External links 
 Facebook Page 

High schools and secondary schools in Gujarat
Sabarkantha district